The Hemisphaeriinae are a subfamily of bugs in the family Issidae, based on the type genus Hemisphaerius.  Species in 107 genera have been recorded in most continents, but the greatest diversity appears to be in South-East Asia.

Tribes and Genera 
Fulgoromorpha Lists On the Web identifies four tribes:

Hemisphaeriini 
Authority: Melichar, 1906 - currently thirty genera are listed from India, China, Indochina, Malesia through to New Guinea:

subtribe Hemisphaeriina Melichar, 1906
 Ceratogergithus Gnezdilov, 2017
 Choutagus Zhang, Wang & Che, 2006
 Epyhemisphaerius Chan & Yang, 1994
 Gergithoides Schumacher, 1915
 Gergithus Stål, 1870
 Hemisphaerius Schaum, 1850 – type genus
 Maculergithus Constant & Pham, 2016
 Neogergithoides Sun, Meng & Wang, 2012
 Neohemisphaerius Chen, Zhang & Chang, 2014
 Ophthalmosphaerius Gnezdilov, 2017
 Rotundiforma Meng, Wang & Qin, 2013
subtribe Mongolianina Wang, Zhang & Bourgoin, 2016
 Bruneastrum Gnezdilov, 2015
 Clypeosmilus Gnezdilov & Soulier-Perkins, 2017
 Eusudasina Yang, 1994
 Euxaldar Fennah, 1978
 Macrodaruma Fennah, 1978
 Mongoliana Distant, 1909
 Retaldar Zhao, Bourgoin & Wang, 2019
subtribe incertae sedis
 Bolbosphaerius Gnezdilov, 2013
 Euhemisphaerius Chan & Yang, 1994
 Gnezdilovius Meng, Webb & Wang, 2017
 Hemiphile Metcalf, 1952
 Hemisphaeroides Melichar, 1903
 Hysteropterissus Melichar, 1906
 Hysterosphaerius Melichar, 1906
 Ishiharanus Hori, 1969
 Neotapirissus Meng & Wang, 2016
 Paramongoliana Chen, Zhang & Chang, 2014
 Tapirissus Gnezdilov, 2014

Kodaianellini 
Authorities: Wang, Zhang & Bourgoin, 2016 - 6 genera in China, Indochina and the Indian subcontinent:
 Dentatissus Chen, Zhang & Chang, 2014
 Kodaianella Fennah, 1956
 Kodaianellissus Wang, Bourgoin & Zhang, 2017
 Neokodaiana Yang, 1994
 Sivaloka Distant, 1906
 Tetricissus Wang, Bourgoin & Zhang, 2017

Parahiraciini 
Authorities: Cheng & Yang, 1991 - 26 genera, widespread but especially Indochina and Malesia:

 Bardunia Stål, 1863
 Bolbossus† Gnezdilov & Bourgoin, 2016
 Brevicopius Meng, Qin & Wang, 2015
 Duriopsilla Fennah, 1956
 Duroides Melichar, 1906
 Flavina Stål, 1861
 Folifemurum Che, Zhang & Wang, 2013
 Fortunia Distant, 1909
 Fusiissus Zhang & Chen, 2010
 Gelastyrella Yang, 1994
 Macrodarumoides Che, Zhang & Wang, 2012
 Mincopius Distant, 1909
 Narinosus Gnezdilov & Wilson, 2005
 Neodurium Fennah, 1956
 Neotetricodes Zhang & Chen, 2012
 Nisoprincessa Gnezdilov, 2017
 Paratetricodes Zhang & Chen, 2010
 Pinocchias Gnezdilov & Wilson, 2005
 Pseudochoutagus Che, Zhang & Wang, 2011
 Rhombissus Gnezdilov & Hayashi, 2016
 Scantinius Stål, 1866
 Tetricodes Fennah, 1956
 Tetricodissus Wang, Bourgoin & Zhang, 2015
 Thabena Stål, 1866
 Thabenula Gnezdilov, Soulier-Perkins & Bourgoin, 2011
 Vindilis Stål, 1870

Sarimini 
Authorities: Wang, Zhang & Bourgoin, 2016 - 25 genera, in Asia and Australia:

 Apsadaropteryx Kirkaldy, 1907
 Balisticha Jacobi, 1941
 Chlamydopteryx Kirkaldy, 1907
 Dactylissus Gnezdilov & Bourgoin, 2014
 Darwallia Gnezdilov, 2010
 Euroxenus Gnezdilov, 2009
 Eusarima Yang, 1994
 Eusarimissus Wang & Bourgoin, 2020
 Givaka Distant, 1906
 Longieusarima Wang, Bourgoin & Zhang, 2017
 Microsarimodes Chang & Chen, 2019
 Neosarima Yang, 1994
 Nikomiklukha Gnezdilov, 2010
 Orbita Meng & Wang, 2016
 Papunega Gnezdilov & Bourgoin, 2015
 Parasarima Yang, 1994
 Sarima Melichar, 1903 – type genus
 Sarimodes Matsumura, 1916
 Sinesarima Yang, 1994
 Sundorrhinus Gnezdilov, 2010
 Syrgis Stål, 1870
 Tempsa Stål, 1866
 Tetrica Stål, 1866
 Vishnuloka Distant, 1906
 Yangissus Chen, Zhang & Chang, 2014

Hemisphaeriinae incertae sedis 
Widespread - 20 genera:

 Amphiscepa Germar, 1830
 Brahmaloka Distant, 1906
 Chimetopina Gnezdilov, 2017
 Coruncanius Distant, 1916
 Devagama Distant, 1906
 Hemisobium Schmidt, 1911
 Jagannata Distant, 1906
 Katonella Schmidt, 1911
 Kivupterum Dlabola, 1985
 Kodaiana Distant, 1916
 Narayana (insect) Distant, 1906
 Orinda (insect) Kirkaldy, 1907
 Picumna Stål, 1864
 Radha Melichar, 1903
 Redarator Distant, 1916
 Samantiga Distant, 1906
 Tatva Distant, 1906
 Thabenoides Distant, 1916

References

External links

Hemiptera subfamilies
Hemisphaeriinae